Rio Ave Futebol Clube, commonly known as Rio Ave, is a Portuguese professional football club based in Vila do Conde, that competes in the Primeira Liga. The club is named after the Ave River, which flows through the town and into the Atlantic Ocean.

Founded in 1939, they play their home matches at Estádio do Rio Ave, also known as the Estádio dos Arcos. Built in 1985, the current stadium seats approximately 12,815 people.

The club's home colours are green and white striped shirts with white shorts and socks, while their away kit consists of a red and white striped shirt and white shorts with yellow socks. Portuguese internationals Alfredo, Paulinho Santos, Quim, Rui Jorge and Fábio Coentrão started their careers at the club. Goalkeepers Jan Oblak and Ederson are some famous talents that were part of this side.

The Vilacondenses' best top-tier league finish was fifth in the 1981–82, 2017–18 and 2019–20 seasons. They reached the 1984 Taça de Portugal Final, where they lost to Porto 4–1, and the 2014 Taça de Portugal Final, where they lost to Benfica 1–0. With this result, Rio Ave qualified for the 2014–15 UEFA Europa League, their first participation in a major European competition.

History
Rio Ave was founded in 1939, soon being nicknamed Rio Grande (Big River). The side had two of its best moments in the 1980s, under the management of Félix Mourinho, father of José Mourinho: in 1981–82, the club finished in a joint-best fifth place, and two years later it reached the Taça de Portugal final, losing to Porto 4–1.

In 2013–14, the club reached both cup finals under the management of Nuno Espírito Santo, but lost to treble-winners Benfica in both. This qualified them to their first European campaign, the 2014–15 UEFA Europa League. New manager Pedro Martins led them past Swedish duo IFK Göteborg and IF Elfsborg to reach the group stage, where they came last.

Under Miguel Cardoso, Rio Ave came fifth in 2017–18, equalling their best finish. Two years later, with Carlos Carvalhal in charge and Iranian Mehdi Taremi the league's joint top scorer, the club equalled this position with a new points record of 55. In October 2020, the team reached the Europa League playoffs but lost at home to A.C. Milan, having conceded a penalty equaliser in the last minute of extra time and then losing 9–8 on penalties. The season, under the returning Cardoso, ended with relegation after a 5–0 aggregate defeat to F.C. Arouca in the playoffs.

European record

Notes
 3Q: Third qualifying round
 PO: Play-off round
 GS: Group stage

Players

Current squad

Out on loan

Honours

National competitions
Taça de Portugal
 Runners-up (2): 1983–84, 2013–14
Taça da Liga
 Runners-up (1): 2013–14
Supertaça de Portugal
 Runners-up (1): 2014
Segunda Divisão / Liga Portugal 2
 Winners (4): 1985–86, 1995–96, 2002–03, 2021–22
Terceira Divisão
 Winners (1): 1976–77

Regional competitions
 AF Porto Cup
 Winners (1): 1966–67

Personnel honours
 SJPF Player of the Month
 Evandro – December 2003
 João Tomás – November 2009, November 2010
 SJPF Young Player of the Month
 Miguel Lopes – October 2008, November 2008
 Yazalde – February 2009
 Fábio Faria – November 2009, December 2009
 Vítor Gomes – October 2011

Coaching staff

|}

Coaching history

  Artur Quaresma (1976–78)
  Pedro Gomes (1978–79)
  Fernando Cabrita (1979–81)
  Félix Mourinho (1981–82)
  Pedro Gomes (1982–83)
  Félix Mourinho (1983–85)
  Mário Reis (1985–86)
  Abel Braga (1986)
  António Morais (1986–87)
  Mário Juliato (1987–88)
  Mário Reis (1988–89)
  Nicolau Vaqueiro (1989)
  Eurico Gomes (1989–90)
  Mário Reis (1990–91)
  Augusto Inácio (1991–92)
  Vieira Nunes (1992)
  José Rachão (1992–93)
  Quinito (1993–94)
  Jaime Pacheco (1994–95)
  Abel Braga (1995)
  Henrique Calisto (1995–96)
  Carlos Brito (1 July 1996 – 30 June 2000)
  Vítor Oliveira (1 July 2000 – 7 Nov 2001)
  Horácio Gonçalves (13 Nov 2001 – 29 Oct 2002)
  Carlos Brito (30 Oct 2002 – 30 June 2005)
  António Sousa (1 July 2005 – 28 Feb 2006)
  João Eusébio (28 Feb 2006 – 5 Jan 2009)
  Carlos Brito (6 Jan 2009 – 15 May 2012)
  Nuno Espírito Santo (1 July 2012 – 19 May 2014)
  Pedro Martins (22 May 2014 – 17 May 2016)
  Capucho (20 May 2016 – 10 Nov 2016)
  Luís Castro (14 Nov 2016 – 12 June 2017)
  Miguel Cardoso (12 June 2017 – 12 June 2018)
  José Gomes (13 June 2018 – 22 December 2018)

League and cup history

References

External links

 
Zerozero team profile
Detailed up-to-date club news

 
Rio Ave
Association football clubs established in 1939
1939 establishments in Portugal
Primeira Liga clubs
Liga Portugal 2 clubs